Uncle Was a Vampire is a 1959 Italian film directed by Steno.

Plot 
Baron Osvaldo Lambertenghi is forced to sell his ancestral castle to pay his debts. The manor is ingloriously transformed into a frivolous hotel, and Osvaldo is allowed to continue to live there working as a bellhop. One day Osvaldo receives a visit from his uncle, Baron Roderico da Frankurten, who turns out to be a real vampire. Osvaldo tries to warn the various guests of the hotel, with the only result being that he is taken for a madman. Bitten by his uncle, Osvaldo will also turn into a vampire, but his beloved, Lellina, will also be able to free him from the curse.

Cast

Production
Uncle Was a Vampire was Christopher Lee's first appearance in an Italian film production.

Release
Uncle Was a Vampire was released in Italy on October 28, 1959 where it was distributed by C.E.I.-Incom. It grossed a total of 385 million lire in Italy.

The film was released in the United States in 1964 on television through Embassy Pictures.

Reception
In his book Italian Horror Film Directors, Louis Paul described the film as "obviously modeled on the slapstick efforts of the comedies featuring the character Totò".

See also
 Christopher Lee filmography
 List of Italian films of 1959

Notes

References

External links
 

1959 films
1959 horror films
1950s comedy horror films
Italian comedy horror films
Films directed by Stefano Vanzina
Films scored by Armando Trovajoli
Vampire comedy films
1959 comedy films
1950s Italian films